The 1898 New South Wales colonial election was held on 27 July 1898 for all of the 125 seats in the 18th New South Wales Legislative Assembly and it was conducted in single-member constituencies with a first past the post voting system. Section 23 (1) of the Parliamentary Electorates and Elections Act of 1893 conferred a right to vote on 'every male person, being a natural born [British] subject, who shall have resided or had his principal place of abode in New South Wales for a continuous period of one year'. The 18th parliament of New South Wales was dissolved on 8 July 1898 by the Governor, Lord Hampden, on the advice of the Premier, George Reid.

The Protectionist Party, the main Opposition, contested this election under the name "National Federal Party", reflecting the party's focus on Federation as an issue at the election.

Key dates

Results

{{Australian elections/Title row
| table style = float:right;clear:right;margin-left:1em;
| title        = New South Wales colonial election, 27 July 1898
| house        = Legislative Assembly
| series       = New South Wales colonial election
| back         = 1895
| forward      = 1901
| enrolled     = 301,989
| total_votes  = 176,998
| turnout %    = 58.61
| turnout chg  = −1.31
| informal     = 1,638
| informal %   = 0.92
| informal chg = +0.04
}}

|}

Retiring members

Changing seats

Notes

References

See also
 Candidates of the 1898 New South Wales colonial election
 Members of the New South Wales Legislative Assembly, 1898–1901

Elections in New South Wales
1898 elections in Australia
1890s in New South Wales
July 1898 events